A tabun oven, or simply tabun (also transliterated taboon, from the ), is a portable clay oven, shaped like a truncated cone. While all were made with a top opening, which could be used as a small stove top, some were made with an opening at the bottom from which to stoke the fire. Built and used in biblical times as the family, neighbourhood, or village oven, tabun ovens continue to be built and used in parts of the Middle East today.

Usage
The tabūn oven has historically been used to bake flatbreads such as taboon bread and laffa, and has been in widespread use in the greater Middle East for centuries. According to an 11th-century Judeo-Arabic commentary on the Mishnah, with a later recension made by an unknown Yemenite Jewish scholar (1105 – 1170 CE), the Arabic word tabūn is equivalent to the Mishnaic Hebrew word  = kūppaḥ, and which, according to Maimonides, produces a heat greater than that of a fire built between two support walls or a support wall having a semi-cylindrical shape carrying a cooking pot ( = kīrah), yet does not produce a heat greater than a regular earthenware baking oven ( = tannūr) and which was usually a permanent fixture. Unlike the fire built between two support walls holding a cooking pot and which flame is exposed to the open-air, the tabūn is a large, overturned earthenware bowl and covers over completely the heated place (usually a bed of smooth stones, upon which a fire is built). After dying out, the ashes are removed and dough is spread out over the smooth stones. Since the tabūn is built with an opening at its top that can be sealed with a ceramic lid, allowing it to be completely smothered over in ashes, dough that is spread out over the stone-lined bottom is quickly baked into bread. When the top ashes are cleared away and the lid removed, a cooking pot can also be laid on top of the tabūn oven for heating and used as a small stove. The early commentators describe the kūppaḥ as being large enough to hold only one cooking pot when used as a stove.

Fuel
Many types of fuel or a combination of fuels can be used to heat a Tabun. Dried animal dung, dried bird droppings, chopped and dried tree branches or tree trimmings, wood chips, charcoal, dried tree leaves, fabrics, and other materials are potential fuels.

Firing
The top opening is covered and a layer of fuel is spread on the outside of the shell and lid. Once the fire takes hold, the fuel is covered with a layer of ash. The fuel will smolder for hours, usually all night long. The smoke also helps in repelling insects and mosquitoes. In the process the heat gets stored in the foundation. The amount of fuel varies depending on the size of oven.

Baking
When the smoke stops, the lid is removed and chunks of dough are hand flattened and placed directly on the limestones. In most ovens, 4 to 5 loaves can be baked at the same time. Then the opening is sealed and the fire stoked using the hot embers and ashes. When the bread is ready, the lid is removed and the bread taken out. The process can be repeated, or other dishes can be baked using metal or pottery trays. The bottom of the bread will take the shape of the pebbles or other materials used in constructing the oven floor. This baking process is  unique and economical and produces aromatic and flavorful food.

In the larger, fixed baking ovens (tannūr), the flattened dough is applied to the inner-wall of the oven, after the wall is dampened with a wet cloth, allowing for adhesion. After baking, the bread is removed.

Construction

Shell
Made of yellow pottery clay soil. The best is from Aaroub or Al Aaroub. The soil is wetted and made into a thick clay mixed with chopped stubble and straw from harvested wheat. The clay is hand-formed to make the dome-shaped shell. The shell  wall is about 2.54 cm (1 in) to 5 cm (2 in) thick. The shell is sun baked for weeks, before it is fired.

Foundation
This impression is usually filled with sand and gravel, or with compacted locally abundant materials known to handle and store heat, such as broken glass, rock salt, and broken potsherds, over which layer beach stones or Suwan stones (flint stones) are carefully embedded.

Lid
Made of  clay or a sheet metal piece large enough to cover the top opening.

Process
In a sheltered area, usually a clay hut or a cave, the foundation is dug in the ground filled and compacted. The shell is placed, wider side down, on top. A layer of clean smooth limestone pebbles about 2.54 cm (1 in) in diameter is spread on top of foundation inside the shell to form a clean baking surface.

See also
Clay oven
Taboon bread
Tandoor
Wood-fired oven

References

Bibliography

Arab cuisine
Palestinian cuisine
Jordanian cuisine
Fireplaces
Ovens
Firing techniques